In the mathematical field of differential geometry, a Kenmotsu manifold is an almost-contact manifold endowed with a certain kind of Riemannian metric.

Definitions 
Let  be an almost-contact manifold.

An almost-contact metric manifold  is said to be a Kenmotsu manifold if

References 

Sources

Differential geometry
Riemannian geometry
Riemannian manifolds
Smooth manifolds